Methodist Episcopal Church is a historic Methodist Episcopal church located at Stony Creek, Warren County, New York.  It was built in 1858-59 and is a vernacular Greek Revival style frame church with a gable roof.  It is 32 feet wide and 48 feet deep and sits on a stone foundation.  It features a square, hip roofed bell tower added in 1874.  The stained glass windows date to the 1950s.

It was added to the National Register of Historic Places in 2010.

References

Churches on the National Register of Historic Places in New York (state)
Churches completed in 1858
19th-century Methodist church buildings in the United States
Churches in Warren County, New York
National Register of Historic Places in Warren County, New York
Methodist Episcopal churches in the United States